Khaneqah-e Gelin (also Romanized as Khāneqāh-e Gelīn and Khāneqāh Golīn; also known as Khāneqāh, Khāngāh, and Khāngān) is a village in Zhavarud-e Sharqi Rural District, in the Central District of Sanandaj County, Kurdistan Province, Iran. At the 2006 census, its population was 259, in 60 families. The village is populated by Kurds.

References 

Towns and villages in Sanandaj County
Kurdish settlements in Kurdistan Province